The Somerville Courthouse is a historic building in Somerville, Alabama.  The oldest extant courthouse in Alabama, it was built in 1837 as the second courthouse for Morgan County.  It served until 1891, when the county seat was moved to the larger Decatur.  The building was later used as a school and town hall.  The courthouse is two stories and constructed of brick, with large, eight-over-eight sash windows on each façade and the sides.  The hipped roof is topped with an octagonal cupola with a wooden base and topped with a finial.  Two interior chimneys pierce the roof on each side.  The courthouse was listed on the National Register of Historic Places in 1972.

References

National Register of Historic Places in Morgan County, Alabama
Courthouses on the National Register of Historic Places in Alabama
Federal architecture in Alabama
Government buildings completed in 1837
County courthouses in Alabama